This is a list of conquistadors who were active in the conquest of terrains that presently belong to Colombia. The nationalities listed refer to the state the conquistador was born into; Granada and Castile are currently part of Spain, but were separate states at the time of birth of the early conquistadors. Important conquistadors and explorers were Alonso de Ojeda, who landed first at Colombian soil and founded the first settlement Santa Cruz, Rodrigo de Bastidas, who founded the oldest still remaining city Santa Marta, Pedro de Heredia, who founded the important city of Cartagena in 1533, Gonzalo Jiménez de Quesada, who was the leader of the first and main expedition into the Andes (1536–1538), with his brother second in command and many other conquistadors, 80% of whom who didn't survive, and Nikolaus Federmann and Sebastián de Belalcázar who entered the Colombian interior from the northwest and south respectively.



Conquistadors in Colombia

See also 

 First wave of European colonization
 European colonization of the Americas
Spanish conquest of Guatemala, Petén
Maya, Chiapas, Yucatán
Aztec,  Honduras
Spanish conquest of the Muisca
Epítome de la conquista del Nuevo Reino de Granada
El Carnero
Spanish conquest of the Chibchan Nations
Spanish conquest of the Inca Empire

Notes

References

Bibliography

Further reading  
 
 
 
 
 
 

Conquest
Conquest
Conquistadors in Colombia
 
 
 
 
 
 
Conquest
Conquest
Conquest